The  is a diesel-electric multiple unit (DEMU) train type built by Nippon Sharyo for use on limited express services operated by Central Japan Railway Company (JR Central). Intended to replace the KiHa 85 series, a prototype trainset was completed in late 2019, with a full-production fleet first materializing in 2022. The fleet was first introduced into service on 1 July 2022 on the Takayama Main Line.

Design 
The first set was manufactured by Nippon Sharyo at its Toyokawa facility. JR Central calls it a "hybrid car", due to the train having electric engines, with power supplied by an onboard diesel generator. While this type of train is widespread in Europe, it is fairly novel in Japan.

Formation 
The sets are formed as follows.

Interior 
Seating across all cars consists primarily of 2+2 abreast seating. Also included are power outlets for all seats, free Wi-Fi, and universal-access toilets. The standard-class interior's seats use a seat moquette of a red–orange gradient, inspired by the autumn leaves alongside the line. Wheelchair spaces are also provided. 

Green cars, which are only available on some four-car sets, incorporate a theme of calmness and quality. The seats use seat moquette with a blue–green gradient, inspired by the greenery alongside the railway line, as well as the river and the sky at dusk.

History 
The first set was unveiled in December 2019. The set has since been deployed on test runs.

Mass production commenced during fiscal 2022, with test runs for the first two production sets, D2 and D3, commencing on 21 April 2022. A total of 64 vehicles are to be built by fiscal 2023, and the prototype set is due to be upgraded to mass-production standards.

The fleet entered service on 1 July 2022, operating on Hida limited-express services on the Takayama Main Line between Nagoya and Takayama. JR Central also plans to introduce HC85 series trainsets on Nanki limited-express services on the Kisei Main Line in the future.

Fleet details

References

External links 

 JR Central news release 
 JR Central HC85 series information (Nippon Sharyo) 

Hybrid multiple units of Japan
Central Japan Railway Company
Train-related introductions in 2022
Nippon Sharyo multiple units